The Srinagar Municipal Corporation is the civic body that governs the city of Srinagar in Uttarakhand, India. Srinagar is the only hill-area in uttarakhand that has the status of municipal corporation.

Wards 
There were 13 wards in the erstwhile Srinagar Municipal Council, namely:
Srinagar
Srikot Malla
Srikot Talla
Uphalda
Dang–Aithna
Agency Mohalla
Ganesh Market
Bagh Bajiron
Bagh Niranjani
Rewadi–Kandai
Kansmardinisain
Bhaktiyana
New Agency Mohalla

Currently, the delimitation and extension of wards is underway. So no gazetted notification is declared about how many wards will be there and what name they are to obtain.

Other than the said 13 wards, 21 Gram Panchayats are added listed as below:
 Nakot
 Digoli
 Dhanchada
 Haidi
 Kaliasaur
 Dhamak
 Dungripanth
 Panth Lagga Dungripanth
 Vaidgaon
 Sem
 Chandrawari
 Svit
 Chopra Lagg Svit
 Chopra
 Bagwan Lagga Chopra
 Pundori
 Ratara
 Koteshwarguth
 Pharasu
 Gahar
 TBD

References

Municipal corporations in Uttarakhand